The China men's national volleyball team represents China in international volleyball competitions and friendly matches, governed by Chinese Volleyball Association. The team competed twice in the Olympic Games, finishing in eighth place at the 1984 Summer Olympics in Los Angeles, California, and fifth place in the 2008 Summer Olympics at home in Beijing. China have been consistently competing the FIVB World Championship, with a best of seventh place in both 1978 and 1982. On a continental level, China won three gold medals at the Asian Games, in 1986, 1990 and 1998. China also won 3 gold medals at the Asian Championship in 1979, 1997 and 1999. The team now ranks 26th in the FIVB World Rankings and the current head coach is Wu Sheng.

Results

Olympic Games
 Champions   Runners up   Third place   Fourth place

World Championship
 Champions   Runners up   Third place   Fourth place

World Cup
 Champions   Runners up   Third place   Fourth place

World Grand Champions Cup
 Champions   Runners up   Third place   Fourth place

World League
 Champions   Runners up   Third place   Fourth place

Nations League
 Champions   Runners up   Third place   Fourth place

Asian Championship
 Champions   Runners up   Third place   Fourth place

Asian Games
 Champions   Runners up   Third place   Fourth place

Asian Cup
 Champions   Runners up   Third place   Fourth place

Team

Current squad
The following is the China 14-man roster for the 2022 FIVB Volleyball Men's World Championship.

Head Coach:  Wu Sheng

Former squads
FIVB Volleyball Men's World Championship
1998
Zheng Liang, Chen Qi, Lu Weizhong, Zhang Liming, Zhou Jianan, Chen Fang, Wang Hebing, Zhang Xiang, Zhao Yong, An Jiajie, Zhu Gang, Li Tieming. Head Coach: Wang Jiawei.
2022
Shi Hairong (c), Zhang Xiaodong, Sui Shengsheng, Zheng Liang, Lu Fei, Tang Miao, He Jiong, Li Hang, Shen Qiong, Wang Haichuan, Chu Hui, Li Chun. Head Coach: Di Anhe.
2006
Cui Xiaodong, Yuan Zhi, Guo Peng, Wang Haichuan, Tang Miao, Cui Jianjun, Li Chun, Yu Dawei, Shen Qiong, Jiang Fudong, Ren Qi, Sui Shengsheng. Head Coach: Zhou Jianan
2010
Bian Hongmin, Yuan Zhi, Zhang Chen, Guo Peng, Liang Chunlong, Zhong Weijun, Cui Jianjun, Jiao Shuai, Chen Ping, Shen Qiong, Li Runming, Ren Qi. Head Coach: Zhou Jianan
2014
Chen Longhai, Yuan Zhi, Liang Chunlong, Zhong Weijun, Cui Jianjun, Jiao Shuai, Geng Xin, Kong Fanwei, Kou Zhichao, Xu Jingtao, Li Runming, Ren Qi, Ji Daoshuai, Fang Yingchao. Head Coach: Xie Guochen
2018
Ji Daoshuai (c), Jiang Chuan, Mao Tianyi, Zhang Binglong, Zhang Jingyin, Yu Yaochen, Du Haixiang, Chen Longhai, Tang Chuanhang, Tong Jiahua, Liu Libin, Rao Shuhan, Miao Ruantong, Ma Xiaoteng. Head Coach: Raúl Lozano

FIVB Volleyball Men's World Cup
2003
Shi Hairong (c), Zhang Xiaodong, Hu Song, Yuan Zhi, Cui Xiaodong, Tang Miao, He Jiong, Li Hang, Li Chun, Shen Qiong, Wu Xiaojiang, Chu Hui. Head Coach: Di Anhe.
2011
Cui Jianjun (c), Bian Hongmin, Zhan Guojun, Yuan Zhi, Zhang Chen, Liang Chunlong, Zhong Weijun, Chen Ping, Geng Xin, Xu Jingtao, Li Runming, Ren Qi, Kong Fanwei, Song Jianwei. Head Coach: Zhou Jianan

FIVB Volleyball Men's World Grand Champions Cup
1997
Sui Shengsheng (c), Xie Wenhao, Yuan Zhi, Guo Peng, Tang Miao, Zhang Chen, He Jiong, Li Chun, Shen Qiong, Fang Yingchao, Chu Hui, Yu Dawei. Head Coach: Di Anhe.

FIVB Volleyball World League
2009
Shen Qiong (c), Bian Hongmin, Dai Qingyao, Guo Peng, Liang Chunlong, Zhong Weijun, Cui Jianjun, Jiao Shuai, Chen Ping, Yu Dawei, Jiang Kun, Li Runming, Ren Qi, Ding Hui. Head Coach: Zhou Jian'an.
2010
Shen Qiong (c), Bian Hongmin, Yuan Zhi, Zhang Chen, Liang Chunlong, Zhong Weijun, Cui Jianjun, Jiao Shuai, Chen Ping, Yu Dawei, Jiang Kun, Xu Jingtao, Li Runming, Ren Qi, Ding Hui. Head Coach: Zhou Jian'an.
2014
Zhong Weijun (c), Bian Hongmin, Yuan Zhi, Zhang Chen, Liang Chunlong, Cui Jianjun, Jiao Shuai, Geng Xin, Kou Zhichao, Li Runming, Chu Hui, Ji Daoshuai. Head Coach: Xie Guochen.
2015
Jiao Shuai (c), Zhang Zhejia, Yuan Zhi, Zhang Chen, Li Yuanbo, Li Runming, Cui Jianjun, Ji Daoshuai, Geng Xin, Dai Qingyao, Rao Shuhan, Tong Jiahua, Ke Junhuang, Song Jianwei. Head Coach: Xie Guochen.
2016
Chen Longhai, Zhang Chen, Li Yuanbo, Li Runming, Cui Jianjun, Jiao Shuai (c), Ji Daoshuai, Geng Xin, Rao Shuhan, Dai Qingyao, Tong Jiahua, Ke Junhuang, Liu Xiangdong and Song Jianwei. Head Coach: Yang Liqun (Week 1 and Week 2), Xie Guochen (Week 3).
2017
Zhong Weijun (c), Li Rui, Jiang Chuan, Mao Tianyi, Zhang Binglong, Li Runming, Han Tianyi, Zhan Guojun, Ji Daoshuai, Chen Longhai, Tong Jiahua, Ke Junhuang, Tang Chuanhang, Liu Libin and Rao Shuhan. Head Coach: Raúl Lozano.

FIVB Volleyball Men's Nations League
2018
Ji Daoshuai (c), Jiang Chuan, Mao Tianyi, Yu Yaochen, Du Haixiang, Chen Longhai, Tang Chuanhang, Tong Jiahua, Liu Libin, Rao Shuhan, Miao Ruantong, Zhang Zuyuan, Chen Jiajie. Head coach: Raúl Lozano.
2019
Ji Daoshuai (c), Dai Qingyao, Jiang Chuan, Mao Tianyi, Wang Jingyi, Yu Yaochen, Du Haixiang, Zhang Zhejia, Chen Longhai, Tong Jiahua, Liu Libin, Rao Shuhan, Peng Shikun, Chen Jiajie, Ma Xiaoteng. Head Coach: Raúl Lozano.
2022
Yu Yaochen (c), Yang Yiming, Zhang Binglong, Yu Yuantai, Yang Tianyuan, Li Yongzhen, Jiang Zhengyang, Peng Shikun, Wang Hebin, Wang Jingyi, Yuan Dangyi, Zhang Guanhua, Miao Ruantong, Zhang Jingyin. Head coach: Wu Sheng.

Asian Men's Volleyball Championship
2021
Jiang Chuan (c), Zhang Binglong, Yang Yiming, Yu Yuantai, Yu Yaochen, Yang Tianyuan, Li Yongzhen, Liu Meng, Jiang Zhengyang, Peng Shikun, Zhang Guanhua, Yuan Dangyi, Miao Ruantong, Zhang Jingyin. Head Coach: Wu Sheng.

Asian Men's Volleyball Cup
2022
Yu Yaochen (c), Dai Qingyao, Qu Zongshuai, Yang Yiming, Zhang Binglong, Yu Yuantai, Li Yongzhen, Liu Meng, Jiang Zhengyang, Zhang Zhejia, Peng Shikun, Zhang Guanhua, Zhang Jingyin, Wang Bin. Head Coach: Wu Sheng.

Head coaches
Note: The following list may not be complete.

  Dai Tingbin (1977–1982)
  Zhu Jiamin (1983)
  Zou Zhihua (1984–1988)
  Yu Youwei (1989–1990)
  Shen Fulin (1991–1997, 2019)
  Wang Jiawei (1997–2000)
  Di Anhe (2001–2005)
  Zhou Jian'an (2005–2012)
  Xie Guochen (2013-2016)
  Raúl Lozano (2017–2019)
  Shen Fulin (2019-2020)
  Wu Sheng (2021–present)

Kit providers
The table below shows the history of kit providers for the China national volleyball team.

Sponsorship
Primary sponsors include: main sponsors like China Construction Bank.

See also
China women's national volleyball team
China men's national under-21 volleyball team
China men's national under-19 volleyball team

References

External links
Official website
FIVB profile

Volleyball
National men's volleyball teams
China national volleyball team